UAAP Season 67 is the 2004–05 athletic year of the University Athletic Association of the Philippines, which was hosted by De La Salle University-Manila. The season opened on July 10, 2004.

Basketball

Men's tournament

Elimination round

Bracket

After La Salle's two ineligible players were discovered after UAAP Season 68, all of their games from Season 66–68 were forfeited. Prior to the forfeiture, La Salle returned their Season 67 championship trophy and their Season 68 runner-up trophy. The UAAP Board subsequently awarded the trophy to FEU in 2006.

Cheerdance
The Cheerdance Competition was held on September 12, 2004 at the Araneta Coliseum.

Overall championship race

Juniors' division

Seniors' division

Individual awards
Athletes of the Year: 
 Men: 
 Women: 
 Boys: 
 Girls:

See also
 NCAA Season 80

External links
UAAP: Solid.(Schools Colleges and Universities)
UST sweeps UAAP overall championships.(Sports)
WebArchive - UST does it for the second time around - www.uaapgames.com
UBelt.com - UAAP Season 67 - Final Overall Championship Tally

 
2004 in Philippine sport
67